Nasim Amrohvi or Syed Qaim Raza Taqvi ((24 August 1908 – 28 February 1987) was a Pakistani Urdu poet, philosopher, and lexicographer who was born as Syed Qaim Raza Taqvi on 24 August 1908 in Amroha, British India.

He belonged to the Taqvi Syed family. His father was Syed Barjees Hussain Taqvi and his mother was Syeda Khatoon. His grand father was Shamim Amrohvi who was bestowed the title of Farazdaq-e-Hind.

In 1950, he migrated to Pakistan after the independence in 1947, settling in Khairpur. He moved to Karachi in 1961 and eventually died there on 28 February 1987.

Work
Nasim Amrohvi was a member of Urdu Lughat Board. Over several years, Nasim Amrohvi compiled an Urdu dictionary entitled Nasim-ul-Lughat. For each word Nasim-ul-Lughat provides not only its meaning, its usage, its related proverbs but also the verses containing it. He also used to write Marsiya besides being a lexicographer.

Books
Some of his major works include:
Khutbat-e-Mushiran (1942)Adabī kahāniyān̲Nasīm ul-lug̲h̲āt, UrdūDust banu dust bana'uRisālah tauz̤ih al-masāʼil. Translation of a book on Shīʻah doctrines by Abū al-Qāsim ibn ʻAlī Akbar al-KhūʼīMūmin-i āl-i Ibrāhīm. Two poems on Shiite themesMusaddas-i Nasīm. On the prophet MuhammadFarhang-i Iqbāl. Large book on the philosophy of Sir Muhammad Iqbal, 1877-1938, national poet of PakistanUrdū lug̲h̲at : tārīk̲h̲ī uṣūl par. Dictionary of Urdu languageMars̲iyah-yi Josh. Elegy on the death of Josh Malihabadi (1896-1982), Urdu poet of PakistanCashmah-yi g̲h̲am. Elegies, chiefly on the martyrs of the battle of KarbalaʻAllāmah Iqbāl ke cāron̲ davāvīn. Dictionary of terms used in the works of Sir Muhammad Iqbal, 1877-1938, national poet of PakistanNazm-e-Urdu''

References

1908 births
1987 deaths
Pakistani male poets
People from Amroha
Muhajir people
Poets from Karachi
20th-century Pakistani poets
Pakistani lexicographers
Iqbal scholars
Linguists from Pakistan
20th-century linguists
20th-century lexicographers